Save the Children is a 1973 American documentary film directed by Stan Lathan and written by Matt Robinson. The concert documentary film chronicles performers that appeared during Jesse Jackson's Operation PUSH exposition held in 1972 in Chicago. The film was released on September 18, 1973, by Paramount Pictures.  A soundtrack to the film was released by Motown Records.

Cast 
Cannonball Adderley 
Jerry Butler 
Sammy Davis Jr.
Dennis Edwards 
Roberta Flack 
Melvin Franklin 
Marvin Gaye 
Cuba Gooding, Sr. 
Damon Harris 
Isaac Hayes 
Jackson 5 
Jackie Jackson 
Jermaine Jackson 
Jesse Jackson 
Marlon Jackson
Michael Jackson 
Tito Jackson 
Gladys Knight 
Merald Knight 
Ramsey Lewis 
Curtis Mayfield 
Wilson Pickett 
Richard Street 	
Otis Williams 
Nancy Wilson 
Bill Withers

See also
 List of American films of 1973

References

External links 
 

1973 films
American documentary films
1973 documentary films
Paramount Pictures films
Concert films
Documentary films about African Americans
1970s English-language films
Films directed by Stan Lathan
1970s American films